BPB may refer to:

BPB plc (British Plaster Board), a British building materials business
Ballet Palm Beach, an American professional ballet company 
BIOS parameter block, a computing data structure
Boridi Airport, Boridi, Papua New Guinea, IATA airport code BPB
Brighton Photo Biennial, a month-long British festival of photography 
Bromophenol blue, a dye
Federal Agency for Civic Education (Bundeszentrale für politische Bildung, or bpb), a German government agency
Pasto language, ISO 639-3 code bpb